Abbottabad (Urdu) is the capital city of Abbottabad District in the Hazara region of eastern Khyber Pakhtunkhwa, Pakistan. It is the 40th largest city in Pakistan and fourth largest in the province of Khyber Pakhtunkhwa by population. Kashmir lies a short distance to the east.

Following the Second Anglo-Sikh War, The British had annexed the entire Punjab region up to Peshawar. Abbottabad was founded in the early 1850s, by a British military officer in the Bengal Army of British Raj, James Abbott and replaced Haripur, as Hazara's capital.

On the 9th of November 1901, the British established a North-West Frontier Province from the north-western districts of The Punjab, this meant that Abbottabad was now a part of the newly formed province.

Following the Announcement of Partition of British Raj into Dominion of Pakistan and Dominion of India, a referendum was held in the NWFP and the result was in favour of Pakistan. In 1955, Abbottabad and the whole NWFP became a part of West Pakistan, but the province was established again in 1970 and Hazara District and the two tribal agencies were merged to form the new Hazara Division with its capital at Abbottabad.

Osama bin Laden, founder of the Islamist militant group al-Qaeda, held refuge at a compound in Abbottabad, where he was shot and killed by U.S. Forces on 2 May 2011.

Established in 1947, Abbottabad houses Pakistan Army's initial officer training academy, the Pakistan Military Academy, referred to by its acronym, PMA.

History

Abbottabad was founded and named after Major James Abbott in January 1853 as the headquarters of Hazara District during the British Raj after the annexation of Punjab. He remained the first Deputy Commissioner of the Hazara district from 1845 until April 1853. Major Abbott is noted for having written a poem titled "Abbottabad", before his return to Britain, in which he wrote of his fondness for the town and his sadness at having to leave it.

In the early 20th century, Abbottabad became an important military cantonment and sanatorium, serving as the headquarters of a brigade in the Second Division of the Northern Army Corps. The garrison consisted of four battalions of native infantry, of the Frontier Force (including the 5th Gurkha Rifles) and two native mountain batteries.

In 1901, the population of the town and cantonment was 7,764 with an average income of Rs. 14,900. This increased to Rs. 22,300 in 1903, chiefly derived from octroi. During this time chief public institutions were built such as the Albert Victor Unaided Anglo-Vernacular High School, the Municipal Anglo-Vernacular High School and the government dispensary. In 1911, the population had risen to 11,506 and the town contained four battalions of Gurkhas. In June 1948, the British Red Cross opened a hospital in Abbottabad to deal with thousands of injured being brought in from Kashmir.

October 2005 earthquake

In October 2005, Abbottabad was devastated by the Kashmir earthquake. Although most of Abbottabad survived, many older buildings were destroyed or severely damaged.

Recent events
On 25 January 2011, Indonesian terrorist Umar Patek was arrested in Abbottabad. Patek, a member of the Jemaah Islamiyah terrorist group, was wanted in connection with a deadly series of church bombings in Indonesia in 2000, and three attacks that killed 202 people in tourist districts of Indonesia in what became known as the Bali bombings.

Osama bin Laden’s hideout

On 2 May 2011, Abbottabad gained worldwide attention when U.S. President Barack Obama announced that Osama bin Laden had been killed in his compound in the city. In February 2012, nine months after bin Laden was killed, Pakistani authorities demolished the compound where Osama bin Laden had lived.

Topography
To the north is the picturesque Kaghan Valley.

Climate
Abbottabad has a humid subtropical climate, with mild to warm temperatures during the spring and autumn months, hot temperatures during June and July, and cool to mild temperatures during the winter. The temperature can rise as high as  during the mid-summer months and drop below  during the extreme cold waves. Snowfall occurs occasionally in December and January, though it is sparse, while heavy rainfall occurs during the monsoon season stretching from July to September that frequently cause flooding in lower lying parts of the city.

Tourism

Abbottabad has been attracting tourists to the city since the colonial era, as it is a major transit point to all major tourist regions of Pakistan such as Nathiagali, Ayubia and Naran.

The Karakoram Highway, which traces one of the paths of the ancient Silk Road, starts from Hasan Abdal on the N5 and heads north passing through the city, eventually reaching Khunjerab Pass. The Karakorum Highway is a major attraction itself for its views. The Karakoram, Himalayas and the Hindu Kush ranges can be approached from Abbottabad, and it continues to be a transit city for tourists, serving as a base for visiting nearby places, such as Hunza, Gilgit, Skardu and Indus Kohistan, of the Karakoram Range.

There was an influx of migrants from Azad Kashmir after the 2005 Kashmir earthquake, another from the Swat District during military operations against militants in 2009 and 2010, and from Waziristan after the army launched major operations against the Taliban in 2009. A £19M amusement park is under construction in the city on a  site; it includes a zoo, adventure sports facilities, restaurants and artificial waterfalls.

Education

Abbottabad has a very healthy literacy rate approximately 56% on an average. The city has a young demographic (ages 15–30) due to the large number of students who have come from across the country to study in its schools, for example PIPS, Army Burn Hall College, Army Public College Kakul and Abbottabad Public School.

The city has a wide variety of post-secondary institutions, such as Ayub Medical College, Frontier Medical College, COMSATS University of Science and Technology, and the University of Engineering & Technology.

Abbottabad is home to the Pakistan Military Academy, a coeducational federal service military academy that provides training to the officers of the Pakistan Army. The academy has three training battalions and 12 companies. Another 2,000 guests each year, from over 34 countries, receive some training at PMA.

According to the Alif Ailaan Pakistan District Education Rankings 2014, Abbottabad is ranked 37 out of 146 districts in Pakistan in the quality of education. For facilities and infrastructure, the district is ranked 67 out of 146.

A detailed picture of the district's education performance is available online.

Media
Kay 2 TV is a local Hindko-language channel. Daily newspapers include Roznama AAJ, Roznama Shamal, Kay 2 Times, Roznama Pine, Weekly Manzar, Daily Mahasib and the Hindko newspaper Chaita.

Sports
The Abbottabad Falcons was the professional cricket team of Abbottabad who played in the national Twenty20 and List A cricket tournaments. Sports facilities in the city include:

 Abbottabad Cricket Stadium
 Abbottabad Hockey Stadium

Transportation
Abbottabad's main public transport consists of modified taxis.

Abbottabad is also served by Daewoo Express and Niazi Express, the NATCO, Skyways and other bus services.

The nearest railway station is in Havelian, which is the last and most northern station on the Pakistan Railways network. The station is approximately thirty minutes drive south from Abbottabad city centre.

References

External links

Alif Ailaan District Education Rankings

Abbottabad District
Hill stations in Pakistan
Metropolitan areas of Pakistan
Populated places established in 1853
Populated places in Abbottabad District
Cities in Khyber Pakhtunkhwa